The women's 3000 metres steeplechase event at the 2005 Summer Universiade was held on 17 August in Izmir, Turkey. It was the first time that this event was contested at the Universiade.

Results

References
Finals results
Full results

Athletics at the 2005 Summer Universiade
2005 in women's athletics
2005